The Maids is a 1975 British film that was directed by Christopher Miles. It is based on the play of the same title by the French dramatist Jean Genet. The film stars Glenda Jackson as Solange, Susannah York as Claire, Vivien Merchant as Madame, and Mark Burns as Monsieur. The film was produced by Ely Landau for the American Film Theatre, which presented thirteen film adaptations of plays in the United States from 1973 to 1975.

Plot 
Solange and Claire are two housemaids who construct elaborate sadomasochistic rituals when their mistress (Madame) is away. The focus of their role-playing is the murder of Madame, and they take turns portraying either side of the power divide. The deliberate pace and devotion to detail guarantees that they always fail to actualize their fantasies by ceremoniously "killing" Madame at the ritual's denouement.

The plot of the film was popularly believed to have been inspired by the murders committed in 1933 by Christine and Léa Papin, although this was denied by Genet.

Cast
 Glenda Jackson as Solange
 Susannah York as Claire
 Vivien Merchant as Madame
 Mark Burns as Monsieur

Production 
Before it was filmed for the American Film Theatre, it ran as a stage play at the Greenwich Theatre, London, with the same principal cast later used for the film version. The director, Christopher Miles planned the 12-day shoot with a single camera which could track anywhere over the set with the cinematographer Douglas Slocombe and deliberately implemented many of Genet's theatrical devices for the film. The camera was often static, the settings lush and extravagant.

Release 
The film was shown at the 1975 Cannes Film Festival, but was not entered into the main competition.

References

Further reading
 Canby indicates that the film opened in New York on 21 April 1975.

External links

1974 films
1974 drama films
BDSM in films
British films based on plays
British psychological drama films
Films directed by Christopher Miles
Films produced by Ely Landau
Films scored by Laurie Johnson
Films shot at EMI-Elstree Studios
Jean Genet
Maids in films
1970s English-language films
1970s British films